This article focuses on the status of ethnic minorities in contemporary Iran.

Ethnic demographics

The majority of the Iranian population is formed by the Persians
(estimated at between 51% and 65%).
The largest other ethno-linguistic groups (accounting for more than 1% of the total population each) are: Azerbaijanis (maximum less than 5%–24%), Kurds (7–10%), Lurs (c. 7%), Mazandaranis and Gilakis (c. 7%),
Arabs (2–3%), Balochi (c. 2%) Turkmens (c. 2%).

There are numerous minor groups, various tribal Turkic groups (Qashqai, Afshar, etc.) accounting for about 1% of the population between them, and small groups with presence in the region going back at least several centuries, accounting for 1-2% as well, such as the Talysh, Armenians, Georgians, Assyrians, Jews, and Circassians.

Furthermore, there are recent immigrant groups, arriving in the 20th to 21st century, such as Russians, Turks, Koreans, Iraqis, etc.

Some of the main ethnic groups in Iran are also religious minorities. For instance, the majority of Kurds, Baluchis and Turkmen are Sunni Muslims, the Armenians are Christian and Mandaeans follow Mandaeism, while the state religion in Iran is Shi'a Islam. Some of these groups, however, have large Shi'a minorities, and the overwhelming majority of Persians and Azeris are Shi'a.

Many of the traditional tribal groups have become urbanized and culturally assimilated during the 19th and 20th centuries, so that ethnic identity in many cases is less than clear-cut.
There have also been considerable intermarriage rates between certain groups, and nearly all groups are fluent in Persian, in many cases marginalizing their traditional native tongue.
Some groups may identify with their status as "ethnic minority" only secondarily, or cite multiple ethnic affiliation.

Current policy
The Constitution of Iran guarantees freedom of cultural expression and linguistic diversity. Many Iranian provinces have radio and television stations in local language or dialect. School education is in Persian, the official language, but use of regional languages is allowed under the constitution of the Islamic Republic, and Azeri language and culture is studied at universities and other institutions of higher education. Article 15 of the constitution states:

Further, Article 19 of the Iranian constitution adds:

There is in fact, a considerable publication (book, newspaper, etc.) taking place in the two largest minority languages in the Azerbaijani language and Kurdish, and in the academic year 2004–05 B.A. programmes in the Azerbaijani language and literature (in Tabriz) and in the Kurdish language and literature (in Sanandaj) are offered in Iran for the very first time. In addition, Payame Noor University, which has 229 campuses and nearly 190,000 students throughout the country, in 2008 declared that Arabic will be the "second language" of the university, and that all its services will be offered in Arabic, concurrent with Persian.

Regional and local radio programmes are broadcast in Arabic, Armenian, Assyrian, Azerbaijani, Baluchi, Bandari, Georgian, Persian, Kurdish, Mazandarani, Turkoman, and Turkish.

However, some human rights groups have accused the Iranian government of violating the constitutional guarantees of equality, and the UN General Assembly has voiced its concern over "increasing discrimination and other human rights violations against ethnic and religious minorities." In a related report, Amnesty International says:

Some Western journalists and commentators have expressed similar views. John Bradley is of the opinion that: 

Separatist tendencies, led by some groups such as the Kurdish Democratic Party of Iran and Komalah in Iranian Kurdistan, for example, had led to frequent unrest and occasional military crackdown throughout the 1990s and even to the present. In Iran, Kurds have twice had their own autonomous regions independent of central government control: The Republic of Mahabad in Iran which was the second independent Kurdish state of the 20th century, after the Republic of Ararat in modern Turkey; and the second time after the Iranian Revolution in 1979.

Jalal Talabani leader of the Iraqi Patriotic Union of Kurdistan (PUK), in a 1998 interview, contrasted the situation in Iran with that of Turkey, with respect to Kurds:

Foreign involvement
One of the major internal policy challenges during the centuries up until now for most or all Iranian governments has been to find the appropriate and balanced approach to the difficulties and opportunities caused by this diversity, particularly as this ethnic or sectarian divisions have often been readily utilized by foreign powers, notably during the Iran–Iraq War. According to Professor Richard Frye:

Foreign governments, both before and after the Islamic Revolution have often been accused of attempting to de-stabilize Iran through exploiting ethnic tensions.

In 2006, U.S. Marine Corps Intelligence commissioned two research projects into Iraqi and Iranian ethnic groups.

Ahwazi Arabs dissidents in Iran have been persecuted by the Iranian authorities, with a number of activists reporting being arrested, imprisoned, tortured, and forced to give false confessions.

Some Iranians accuse Britain of "trying to topple the regime by supporting insurgents and separatists". Other states however are also believed to be involved in the politics of ethnicity in southern Iran. Professor Efraim Karsh traces out the origins of Saddam Hussein's wish to annex Khuzestan using the ethnic card:

During Iran's 1979 revolution, after sending thousands of Iraqi Shi'ites into exile in Iran and the quick and brutal suppression of Kurdish dissent,

During the cold war, the Soviet Union's "tentacles extended into Iranian Kurdistan". As the main supporter of ethnic communist enclaves such as the Republic of Mahabad, and (later on) as the main arms supplier of Saddam Hussein, both the Soviet Union and its predecessor the Russian Empire, made many attempts to divide Iran along ethnic lines. Moscow's policies were specifically devised "in order to sponsor regional powerbases, if not to annex territory". For example, in a cable sent on July 6, 1945 by the Central Committee of the Communist Party of the Soviet Union, the Secretary of the Communist Party of Soviet Azerbaijan was instructed to "Organize a Separatist Movement in Southern Azerbaijan and Other Provinces in Northern Iran."

The Republic of Azerbaijan is also accused of encouraging ethnic divisions in the Iranian region of Azerbaijan.

Historical notes

Iran (then called Persia) traditionally was governed over the last few centuries in a fairly decentralized way with much regional and local autonomy. In particular, weaker members of the Qajar dynasty often did not rule much beyond the capital Tehran, a fact exploited by the imperial powers Britain and Russia in the 19th century. For example, when British cartographers, diplomats, and telegraph workers traveled along Iran's southern coast in the early 19th century laden with guns and accompanied by powerful ships, some local chieftains quickly calculated that their sworn allegiance to the Shah in Tehran with its accompanying tax burden might be optional. When queried, they proclaimed their own local authority. However during Constitutional Revolution ethnic minorities including Azeris, Bakhtiaris and Armenians fought together for establishment of democracy in Iran while they had the power to become independent.

Reza Shah Pahlavi, and to a lesser degree his son Mohammed Reza Pahlavi, successfully strengthened the central government by using reforms, bribes and suppressions. In particular, the Bakhtiaris, Kurds, and Lurs until the late 1940s required persistent military measures to keep them under governmental control. According to Tadeusz Swietochowski, in 1930s Reza Shah Pahlavi pursued the official policy of Persianization to assimilate Azerbaijanis and other ethnic minorities in Iran:

According to Lois Beck in 1980:

In studying the history of ethnicity in Iran, it is important to remember that "ethnic nationalism is largely a nineteenth century phenomenon, even if it is fashionable to retroactively extend it."

See also
 Armenian-Iranians
 Azarbaijan (Iran)
 Demographics of Iran
 Georgians in Iran
 Human rights in Iran
 Iranian Georgians
 Iranian Circassians
 Peoples of the Caucasus in Iran
 Russians in Iran
 Assyrians in Iran
 Iranian Arabs
 Iranian Azeris
 Iranian Kurdistan
 Iranian Kuwaitis
 Koreans in Iran
 Languages and ethnicities in Iran
 Religious minorities in Iran

References

Iran
Persecution in Iran